Revolution Begins is the third EP by Swedish melodic death metal band Arch Enemy. It was released on 31 August 2007, through Century Media Records. A music video was made for the self-titled song, "Revolution Begins", containing cyber-revolution scenes. The songs, "Revolution Begins" and "Blood on Your Hands" are featured on the album Rise of the Tyrant. "Walk in the Shadows" is a Queensrÿche cover.

Track listing

Personnel 
 Angela Gossow − vocals
 Michael Amott − guitar
 Christopher Amott − guitar
 Sharlee D'Angelo − bass
 Daniel Erlandsson − drums

2007 EPs
Arch Enemy albums
Century Media Records EPs